Andahuaylas Province is the second largest of the seven provinces of the Apurímac Region in Peru. The capital of the province is the city of Andahuaylas. The province is located in the north-western part of the region and measures .

Boundaries
North: Chincheros Province and Ayacucho Region
East: Abancay Province and Aymaraes Province
South: Ayacucho Region
West: Ayacucho Region

Geography 
Other mountains are listed below:

Some of the largest lakes in the province are Antaqucha, Quriqucha, Suqtaqucha, Suyt'uqucha and Wachuqucha.

Political division 
The Andahuaylas province is divided into nineteen districts, which are:

Ethnic groups 
The people in the province are mainly indigenous citizens of Quechua descent. Quechua is the language which the majority of the population (73.54%) learnt to speak in childhood, 26.09% of the residents started speaking using the Spanish language and  0.19% using Aymara  (2007 Peru Census).

Archaeology 
Some of the most important archaeological sites of the province are Awkimarka, Llamachayuq and  Suntur.

References

External links 
  Official Website Andahuaylas Province

Provinces of the Apurímac Region